The Million Dollar Rip-Off is a 1976 American made-for-television crime comedy film starring Freddie Prinze in his television film debut and his only film role of any kind. Directed by Alexander Singer and written by Andrew Peter Marin based on a screenplay by William Devane and John Pleshette, the film premiered on NBC on September 22, 1976.

Plot
An ex-con electronics genius (Prinze) and his four female accomplices devise a plot to steal millions of dollars from the Chicago Transit Authority. A detective, who has been keeping tabs on him since he got out of prison, suspects that he is up to something and tries to catch him at it.

Cast
 Freddie Prinze as Muff Kovak
 Allen Garfield as Lieutenant Ralph Fogherty
 Christine Belford as Lil
 Linda Scruggs as Helene (as Linda Scruggs Bogart)
 Joanna Kerns as Jessie (as Joanna DeVarona)
 Brooke Mills as Kitty
 James Sloyan as Lubeck
 Bob Hastings as Sergeant Frank Jarrett
 Gary Vinson as Hennessy

References

External links
 
 
 

1976 television films
1976 films
1970s crime comedy films
1970s heist films
American crime comedy films
American heist films
Films scored by Vic Mizzy
Films shot in Chicago
Films shot in Los Angeles
NBC network original films
Films directed by Alexander Singer
1970s American films